Daniel Ritchie (born 6 January 1987 in Margate) is a British rower.

Rowing career
Ritchie was introduced to rowing while attending The Southport School in Queensland, Australia. 

He was part of the British squad that topped the medal table at the 2011 World Rowing Championships in Bled, where he won a silver medal as part of the eight with Nathaniel Reilly-O'Donnell, Cameron Nichol, James Foad, Alex Partridge, Moe Sbihi, Greg Searle, Tom Ransley and Phelan Hill. Two years later he competed at the 2013 World Rowing Championships in Chungju, where he won a gold medal as part of the eight with Tom Ransley, Alex Gregory, Pete Reed, Moe Sbihi, Andrew Triggs Hodge, George Nash, Will Satch and Phelan Hill.

References

External links 
 

1987 births
Living people
English male rowers
British male rowers
People from Margate
World Rowing Championships medalists for Great Britain